John Carleton (born 24 November 1955) is a former  international rugby union player. He played as a wing.

He played for Orrell R.U.F.C.

He had 26 caps for England, from 1979 to 1984, scoring 7 tries, 28 points on aggregate. He had 20 caps at the Five Nations Championship, from 1980 to 1984, where he scored all the tries of his international career. He was part of the team that won the 1980 Five Nations Championship, with a Grand Slam.

He toured twice with the British and Irish Lions, to South Africa in 1980 and New Zealand in 1983, winning 3 caps on each tour.

Notes

1955 births
Alumni of the University of Chester
British & Irish Lions rugby union players from England
England international rugby union players
English rugby union players
Living people
Orrell R.U.F.C. players
Rugby union wings
People educated at Upholland Grammar School